Geraint Løvgreen is a Welsh singer-songwriter.

He has been described as one of the most prolific composers of his era, and one of the wittiest of writers.

His daughter Mari Lovgreen is a Welsh television presenter.

References

Year of birth missing (living people)
Living people
Welsh singer-songwriters
People from Wrexham County Borough